Binibining Pilipinas 2023 will be the 59th edition of Binibining Pilipinas.

At the end of the event, Nicole Borromeo and Chelsea Fernandez will crown their respective successors. Only two titles will be awarded this edition after Binibining Pilipinas Charities, Inc. lose the franchise for Binibining Pilipinas Grand International and Binibining Pilipinas Intercontinental.

Background

Selection of participants
On January 6, 2023, the organization launched its search for the next set of Filipinas who will represent the Philippines at different international pageants. The final submission of the application was on January 31, 2023. The final screening and selection of the official contestants were done on February 6, 2023.

Contestants
40 candidates will compete for the two titles:

Notes

References

External links

2023
2023 beauty pageants
2023 in the Philippines
Beauty pageants in the Philippines